Kratos may refer to:

Kratos (mythology), the personification of strength in Greek mythology
Kratos (EP), a 2016 mini-album by VIXX
Kratos (God of War), the main character in the God of War series of video games
Kratos Aurion, a character from Tales of Symphonia
Kratos Defense & Security Solutions, a U.S. military contractor
Kratos MS 50, a tool for electron ionization
Operation Kratos, tactics developed by London's Metropolitan Police Service for dealing with suspected bombers